Nataliya Petrovna Lavrinenko (born 30 March 1977, in Krychaw) is a Belarus rower. She competed in rowing at the 1996 Summer Olympics.

References

External links 
 
 
 
 

1977 births
Living people
Belarusian female rowers
People from Krychaw
Rowers at the 1996 Summer Olympics
Olympic bronze medalists for Belarus
Olympic rowers of Belarus
Olympic medalists in rowing
Medalists at the 1996 Summer Olympics
Sportspeople from Mogilev Region